Alejandro Baltazar Maldonado Aguirre (born January 6, 1936) is a Guatemalan statesman who was the Acting President of Guatemala,  following the Congress of Guatemala's acceptance of the resignation of President Otto Pérez Molina on September 3, 2015.

He was elected as vice president by Congress on May 14, 2015, after his predecessor, Roxana Baldetti, resigned amid allegations of corruption. Before becoming vice president, he served as a constitutional judge, congressional deputy, ambassador to the United Nations, and political leader, including a failed presidential bid in 1982. He was Minister of Education from 1970 to 1974 and Minister of Foreign Affairs from 1995 to 1996.

History
Born in Guatemala City, Maldonado graduated from San Carlos University with a degree in law.

Since the 1960s, he was a member of the far-right National Liberation Movement political party (Movimiento de Liberacion Nacional or MLN), alleged to have started the use of death squads against communists. He was also Minister of Education under the military regime of Arana Osorio (1970–1974) and defended Guatemala before the United Nations when the international community isolated the military regime of Lucas García (1978–1982) for its gross human rights violations.

In the 1980s, he formed the National Renewal Party and joined a coalition with Guatemalan Christian Democracy in the 1982 election. Maldonado placed third in a blatantly rigged election which he may have won had the contest been free and fair, which was followed by a military coup. In 1985 he was again a presidential candidate for his party but placed seventh out of eight candidates and only one seat in Congress. He would continue to hold numerous public posts, including that of Foreign Minister.

Later, Maldonado served as a judge on the Constitutional Court judge on three occasions.

One week after his appointment as Vice President in May 2015, protesters sought his resignation because he had overturned the guilty verdict in the Ríos Montt trial.

Public positions held
1956: Member of the Guatemala City Council 
1966–1970: Congressional deputy, for the National Liberation Movement
1970–1974: Minister of Education (under President Arana Osorio)
1974–1976: Ambassador to the United Nations (New York City)
1978–1980: Ambassador to the United Nations (Geneva)
1984–1986: Deputy to the National Constituent Assembly
1986–1991: Magistrate of the Constitutional Court (incl. 1989–1991, President)
1991–1995: Ambassador to Mexico
1995–1996: Minister of Foreign Affairs (under President de León Carpio)
1996–2001: Magistrate of the Constitutional Court (incl. 1997–1998, President)
2004–2006: Congressional deputy, for the Unionist Party
2006–2011: Magistrate of the Constitutional Court (incl. 2006–2007, President)
2015: Vice President of the Republic
2015: President of the Republic

Vice President of Guatemala
Maldonado served as Vice President of Guatemala from his selection to the position following the resignation of Roxana Baldetti on May 14, 2015, until his accession as president on September 3, 2015.

President of Guatemala
Maldonado, as vice president, became acting president of Guatemala on September 3, 2015, upon the confirmation by the Congress of Guatemala of the resignation of President Otto Pérez Molina.

References

External links

Alejandro Maldonado Aguirre: el nuevo Presidente de Guatemala
Former Constitutional Court Judge Alejandro Maldonado Aguirre Appointed Vice President
Congressional résumé
Biography by CIDOB (in Spanish)

|-

1936 births
Foreign ministers of Guatemala
Guatemalan diplomats
20th-century Guatemalan judges
Ambassadors of Guatemala to Mexico
Government ministers of Guatemala
Living people
Members of the Congress of Guatemala
Presidents of Guatemala
Unionist Party (Guatemala) politicians
Vice presidents of Guatemala
People from Guatemala City
21st-century Guatemalan judges